Imill Wawani (Aymara mimilla, imilla, mimilla wawa girl, ni a suffix to indicate ownership, "the one with a girl", Hispanicized spelling Imillhuahuani) is a   mountain in the Chilla-Kimsa Chata mountain range in the Andes of Bolivia. It is situated in the La Paz Department, Ingavi Province, Jesús de Machaca Municipality, north-east of Ch'ama (Chama). Imill Wawani lies south-west of the mountain Apachita and south-east of the mountain Jisk'a Sallalla.

References 

Mountains of La Paz Department (Bolivia)